On 15 October 2021, a suicide bombing occurred at the Imam Bargah Mosque, also known as Fatima Mosque, a Shia mosque during Friday prayers in Kandahar, Afghanistan, killing at least 65 people and wounding more than 70 others.

The bombing attacks 
At around 13:00 local time, 4 bombers arrived at the mosque gate, where two of them blew themselves up, making way for their accomplices, who continued the terrorist attack among the approximately 3,000 worshippers inside the mosque, detonating two more bombs.

It came a week after a bombing claimed by the Islamic State – Khorasan Province at a Shia mosque in Kunduz killed 46 people. Following the attack, the Taliban government promised to provide security at Shia mosques as well as expressed its condolences to the families of the victims and promised to bring the perpetrators to justice.

Claim of Responsibility 
The Islamic State – Khorasan Province claimed responsibility for the attack according to a statement released by the group's media wing, Amaq.

References

2021 murders in Afghanistan
2020s building bombings
2021 bombing
21st-century mass murder in Afghanistan
Attacks on buildings and structures in 2021
Attacks on religious buildings and structures in Afghanistan
Attacks on Shiite mosques
Building bombings in Afghanistan
2021 Kandahar bombing
ISIL terrorist incidents in Afghanistan
Islamic terrorist incidents in 2021
Mass murder in 2021
Mosque bombings by Islamists
Mosque bombings in Asia
October 2021 crimes in Asia
October 2021 events in Afghanistan
Suicide bombings in 2021
Suicide bombings in Afghanistan
Terrorist incidents in Afghanistan in 2021
Violence against Shia Muslims in Afghanistan